The Rejuvenation of Aunt Mary is a 1914 silent film comedy produced by Klaw and Erlanger in association with the Biograph Company. It is based on a Broadway play, The Rejuvenation of Aunt Mary by Anne Warner which starred May Robson.

A print is preserved at the Library of Congress.

Cast
Reggie Morris - Jack Denham
Gertrude Bambrick - Betty Burnett
Kate Toncray - Aunt Mary                                          
Dell Henderson - Aunt Mary's Sweetheart

See also
The Rejuvenation of Aunt Mary (1927)

References

External links
 The Rejuvenation of Aunt Mary at IMDb.com

1914 films
American silent feature films
Films directed by Edward Dillon
Silent American comedy films
1914 comedy films
American black-and-white films
1910s English-language films
1910s American films